Hastings High School (HHS) is a public secondary school located in Hastings, Nebraska, United States.  It is part of the Hastings Public Schools school district. Other area high schools are St. Cecilia High School and Adams Central Junior-Senior High School. HHS is the largest of the three.

In the media 
Hastings High was featured in the independent film Easter during a football game flashback sequence.

Notable alumni 
 Marc Boerigter, former NFL player
 Stephen Goodin, NFL player
 Robert Keith Gray, advisor to President Dwight Eisenhower
 Rick Henninger, former MLB player
 Johnny Hopp, former MLB player 
 Tom Osborne, former football coach; former NFL player; former U.S. congressman
 Paul Schissler, former college/NFL coach
 Lon Stiner, former college football coach
 Dazzy Vance, MLB Hall-of-Famer

References

 
 

Public high schools in Nebraska
Schools in Adams County, Nebraska
Educational institutions established in 1884
Buildings and structures in Hastings, Nebraska
1884 establishments in Nebraska